Abubshahar Wildlife Sanctuary is situated in Sirsa district of Haryana state, India. It is spread over an area of 11530.56 hectares. It is 15 km away from Mandi Dabwali on the Dabwali-Sangariya road. Forests Department, Haryana of Government of Haryana officially notified this as Wildlife Sanctuary on 30 January 1987.

The plan is to change the status of this sanctuary into a Community Reserve, in order to ensure the participation of the local population in the plan for the protection of flora and fauna. Eleven villages gravitate to this area.

Location
It is located 10 km from Mandi Dabwali on Dabawali-Sangaria road at location map.

Area
The sanctuary is spread over 11.530.56 hectares, which is approximately 29,000 acres.

Images of type of wildlife found

Nearby attractions
 Fort of King Saras in Sirsa

See also
 List of National Parks & Wildlife Sanctuaries of Haryana, India
 Haryana Tourism
 List of Monuments of National Importance in Haryana
 List of State Protected Monuments in Haryana
 List of Indus Valley civilization sites in Haryana, Punjab, Rajasthan, Gujarat, India and Pakistan

References 

Wildlife sanctuaries in Haryana
Villages in Sirsa district
1987 establishments in Haryana
Protected areas established in 1987